Léa Curinier (born 21 April 2001) is a French professional racing cyclist, who currently rides for UCI Women's Continental Team . In October 2020, she rode in the women's edition of the 2020 Liège–Bastogne–Liège race in Belgium.

References

External links

2001 births
Living people
French female cyclists
Sportspeople from Valence, Drôme
Cyclists from Auvergne-Rhône-Alpes